Alemu (Amharic: ዓለሙ) is a male name of Ethiopian (Habesha) origin. Notable people with the name include:

Alemu Abebe, Ethiopian politician during Derg rule
Alemu Aga (born 1950), Ethiopian musician and singer
Alemu Bekele (born 1990), Ethiopian long-distance runner for Bahrain
Agwa Alemu (died 1992), Ethiopian Marxist Waz League politician
Berhanu Alemu (born 1982), Ethiopian middle-distance runner
Dagne Alemu (born 1980), Ethiopian long-distance runner
Deriba Alemu (born 1983), Ethiopian long-distance runner
Elfenesh Alemu (born 1975), Ethiopian female marathon runner
Tadesse Alemu (died 2007), Ethiopian singer

Amharic-language names